The litungu is a traditional lyre played by the Luhya ethnic group of Kenya (including the Bukusu subgroup). It has seven strings. Other varieties of litungu are used by the Kurya and Kisii ethnic groups.

References
"Some Musical Instruments of Kenya", by Graham Hyslop (African Arts, v. 5, no. 4, Summer 1972, pp. 48–55).

External links
Litungu photo

Listening

Kenyan musical instruments
Lyres